James Randy Forbes (born February 17, 1952) is an American politician.

Prior to joining the United States Congress, he was a member of the Virginia House of Delegates, Virginia State Senate, and Chairman of the Republican Party of Virginia. Forbes formerly served as Chairman of the Seapower and Projection Forces Subcommittee of the House Armed Services Committee.

During the Donald Trump administration, Forbes was reviewed as a prospective choice for Secretary of the Navy. Forbes campaigned for Trump in the 2016 presidential election. Forbes was passed over twice for the first-round and second round nominations of Secretary of the Navy.

Forbes served as a senior distinguished fellow at the U.S. Naval War College from February through December 2017.

Early life, education and career
Forbes was born in Chesapeake, Virginia, the son of Thelma and Malcolm J. Forbes. Forbes graduated first in his class from Randolph-Macon College in 1974.

He received his Juris Doctor from the University of Virginia School of Law in 1977. Forbes worked in private practice for Kaufman & Canoles PC.

Political career
Forbes served in the Virginia House of Delegates from 1989 to 1997 and the Virginia State Senate from 1997 to 2001. He also served as chairman of the Republican Party of Virginia from 1996 to 2001.

He was first elected to the House in 2001 to fill a vacancy caused by the death of ten-term Democratic Congressman Norman Sisisky; defeating Democratic State Senator Louise Lucas 52–48%. After the 4th district was reconfigured as part of redistricting, he ran unopposed by Democrats in 2002 and 2006. In 2004, he faced Jonathan R. Menefee, and won with 65% of the vote. He faced Wynne LeGrow in the 2010 election, and was easily re-elected with 62% of the vote. In 2012, he defeated Chesapeake City Councilwoman Ella Ward with 57% of the vote.

Forbes was the founder and chairman of the Congressional Prayer Caucus and the Congressional China Caucus.  He championed a plan to rebuild the Navy to 350 ships as chairman of the House Seapower Subcommittee.

On February 8, 2016, he announced that he would run for election to Virginia's 2nd Congressional District in November 2016 after a court-ordered redistricting saw the 4th absorb most of the majority-black areas around Richmond. The new map turned the 4th from a Republican-leaning swing district into a strongly Democratic district. He did so while at the same time announcing that he would continue to live in Chesapeake, which remained in the 4th; members of the House are only constitutionally required to live in the state they represent. Forbes stated that his seniority gave him a chance to become the first Virginian to chair the House Armed Services Committee. The 2nd District was being vacated by fellow Republican Scott Rigell.

Forbes accused state Delegate and former U.S. Navy SEAL, Scott Taylor, of criminal activity for speeding violations and missing a court appearance, including a scheduled hearing when Taylor was deployed with the Navy. On June 14, 2016, Forbes was defeated in the Republican primary by Scott Taylor by a margin of 52.5% to 40.6%, with a third candidate, C. Pat Cardwell IV, receiving 6.8% of the vote. Taylor went on to win the general election on November 8, 2016.

Forbes received $801,606 in campaign financing from donors in the defense industry during his tenure in Congress.  The largest donors to Forbes over his Congressional career have been defense contractors serving the U.S. Navy for aviation and ship construction, including Northrop Grumman, BAE Systems, Leidos and Huntington Ingalls.

After leaving Congress in 2017, Forbes joined the Government Law & Policy Practice’s Federal team at Greenberg Traurig as a Senior Director.

U.S. House of Representatives

Elections

Committee assignments

 Committee on Armed Services
 Subcommittee on Seapower and Projection Forces (Chairman)
 Subcommittee on Readiness (Ex-Chairman)
 Committee on Education and the Workforce
 Committee on the Judiciary
 Subcommittee on the Constitution
 Subcommittee on Crime, Terrorism, and Homeland Security

Memberships
Forbes founded the Congressional Prayer Caucus in 2005 and co-chaired the caucus with Senator James Lankford.

Political positions

Defense

Forbes was formerly Chairman of the House Armed Services Committee's Seapower and Projection Forces subcommittee.

In 2013, Forbes publicly opposed military action in both Libya and Syria. In 2014, he promised to promote President Obama's call for funds for action in Syria.

In 2014, Forbes voted to address cuts imposed by sequestration with a $1.4 billion cut to operations, maintenance, and training funds, rather than mothballing 11 cruisers and three amphibious warships.

China
Forbes was founder and chairman of the Congressional China Caucus. Forbes spoke a panel discussion at Harvard University in the April 2012 on U.S. strategy to China's world power emergence. Forbes has voiced concern for Chinese military ambition, cyber threats, contaminated exports, and human rights violations. His reputation has come under scrutiny with the recent acquisition of America's largest pork company, Smithfield Foods, by a Chinese competitor – a company headquartered within his district. This $4.7 billion deal is the biggest Chinese acquisition of a U.S. company to date.

Energy 
On June 12, 2008, Forbes introduced H.R. 6260, titled "New Manhattan Project for Energy Independence". The bill was offered as a substitute for the entire energy bill and outlined a series of prizes, similar to the X-PRIZE, which would be awarded to a private entity, which completed one of seven tasks related to achieving energy independence.

The bill included $14 billion in prizes and $10 billion in grants ($10 billion of which would have supported nuclear fusion research); provisions to establish a summit to discuss the challenge of energy independence; and creation of a commission to offer recommendations to fulfill the goal of becoming energy independent within 20 years. On June 26, 2009, the bill was offered as an amendment in the nature of a substitute for the Waxman/Markey-sponsored American Clean Energy and Security Act. The amendment was rejected by the House of Representatives 255–172.

LGBT rights 
In 2015, Forbes cosponsored a resolution to amend the US constitution to ban same-sex marriage.

Electoral history

*Write-in and minor candidate notes:  In 2004, write-ins received 170 votes.  In 2006, write-ins received 886 votes. In 2008, write-ins received 405 votes. In 2010, write-ins received 432 votes. In 2014, write-ins received 257 votes.

** Sisisky died on March 29, 2001; Forbes won the 2001 special election to fill out the remainder of his term.

References

External links

 
 
 
 Congressional China Caucus
 "U.S. House approves Forbes' bill reaffirming 'In God We Trust'" , Hampton Roads, November 2, 2011

|-

1952 births
20th-century American politicians
21st-century American politicians
Baptists from Virginia
Living people
Republican Party members of the Virginia House of Delegates
Naval War College faculty
Politicians from Chesapeake, Virginia
Randolph–Macon College alumni
Republican Party members of the United States House of Representatives from Virginia
Republican Party of Virginia chairs
Southern Baptists
University of Virginia School of Law alumni
Virginia lawyers
Republican Party Virginia state senators